Pascal Chaumeil (9 February 1961 – 27 August 2015) was a French director and screenwriter. He started out as an assistant director in the 1980s, working with directors such as Pierre Tchernia and Luc Besson. He was nominated for two César Awards, both for the film Heartbreaker (2010). He died in 2015.

Filmography

References

External links

1961 births
2015 deaths
French male screenwriters
French screenwriters
French television directors
French film directors